Christopher T. Whelan is an Irish academic who is professor and head of sociology in UCD. He was formerly a research professor at the Economic and Social Research Institute (ESRI) in Dublin, Ireland, where he coordinated the research programmes of social inclusion and social cohesion and quality of life.

Whelan is a leading researcher on such issues as the causes and consequences of poverty and inequality, the measurement and monitoring of poverty, social inclusion, social mobility, quality of life, and inequality of opportunity. His research has been published in leading journals, including the European Sociological Review. He is a sociologist, but his work straddles sociology and economics, and he was listed among Ireland's top economists.

Whelan has served on committees, including the Social Sciences Committee of the Royal Irish Academy, the Standing Committee of the Social Sciences of the European Science Foundation, and the Council of Economic and Social Studies.

Whelan has appeared in Irish news sources such as The Irish Times.

References

External links
 Home page
 Google Scholar

Academics of University College Dublin
Economic and Social Research Institute
Living people
Year of birth missing (living people)